Julia Shalett Vinograd (December 11, 1943 – December 5, 2018) was a poet. She is well known as "The Bubble Lady" to the Telegraph Avenue community of Berkeley, California, a moniker she gained from blowing bubbles at the People's Park demonstrations in 1969. Vinograd is depicted blowing bubbles in the People's Park Mural off of Telegraph Avenue in Berkeley.

Education
Vinograd was born in Berkeley, California, the daughter of Sherna Shalett and her husband, chemist Jerome Vinograd.  Her family, including younger sister Deborah, relocated to Southern California when her father joined the faculty of the California Institute of Technology.  Vinograd graduated with a B.A. from the University of California at Berkeley in 1965, and went to Iowa, graduating with a Master of Fine Arts from the Iowa Writers Workshop at the University of Iowa.

Poetry

Vinograd became part of the "street culture" of Berkeley beginning in the 1960s and was often called a "street poet". She was also an active participant in the influential poetry slam scene at Cafe Babar in the Mission District from the mid-Eighters through the 1990s, where she yelled "Staaaaaarting!" at the beginning of each night of poetry.

She published numerous books of poetry and her work has been included in a number of anthologies, including Berkeley! A Literary Tribute. She also edited the anthology New American Underground Poetry, Vol 1: The Babarians of San Francisco alongside David Lerner and Alan Allen. She was also profiled in Contemporary Authors.

Honors and awards
Vinograd was awarded a Pushcart Prize for her poem, "For The Young Men Who Died of AIDS,"  and in 1985 won an American Book Award from the Before Columbus Foundation.

The City of Berkeley, California, awarded her a Poetry Lifetime Achievement Award.  On June 5, 2004, Berkeley Mayor Tom Bates declared that day to be "Julia Vinograd Day," for representing the spirit of Berkeley: "She gives us a voice when ours vanishes. She gives voice to the homeless, the street performers, the merchant, the coffee drinker, friends and foes alike, and her words, like a sharp knife, cut deep into the truth. She describes us as full of life, and love, and heartache. She makes us honest. We, the eccentric, the lonely, the broken are given a voice." She has been called Berkeley unofficial "poet laureate".

A feature documentary is in production about Vinograd's life and work, Julia Vinograd: Between Spirit and Stone.

Bibliography

Recordings

Anthologies

References

External links
Julia Vinograd: Between Spirit and Stone Feature documentary in production.

1943 births
2018 deaths
Writers from Berkeley, California
American women poets
University of California, Berkeley alumni
University of Iowa alumni
20th-century American poets
21st-century American poets
20th-century American women writers
21st-century American women writers
Poets from California
Jewish American poets
21st-century American Jews

es:Julia Vinograd